"Big in Japan" is the debut single of the German synth-pop band Alphaville. It was taken from their 1984 debut album Forever Young.

The single was a success in many countries, including Germany, Sweden and Switzerland. It was also the group's only UK Top 75 hit, reaching No. 8 on the UK Singles chart. The song also reached number one on the Hot Dance Club Play in December 1984.

Lyrics, music and theme
The group had a Roland System-100M which they first used to create the bassline. The timing of the song was influenced by "The Safety Dance", changing the speed to double-time, halfway through the song. The melody was developed by all three members of the band, working in their provincial home studio.

Marian Gold developed most of the lyrics while going to a dentist. The theme was based on two friends who were involved in the sordid drug scene of Berlin's Zoo station. The song tells of such lovers who fantasize about being drug-free. The refrain "big in Japan" symbolises this idea of being successful in another world. Said Gold, "that line has a certain meaning. It means that if you're a complete loser, you're telling other people, 'I'm not a loser because in Japan I'm really big.' It's the lie of the loser and it fitted perfectly into the story of these junkies, which the song is about, in a very tragic way." Gold later explained "we originally weren’t sure whether we should put it on the album, because it’s a bit autobiographical in that it reflects my time in West Berlin in the late 70s, with the drug scene around the train station and the zoo, and all the underground things. It has nothing to do with Japan."

The phrase was inspired by the name of the real band, Big in Japan, whose album Gold had recently bought. He said "As you know, there's a considerable musical market in Japan. If you wanted to become famous, what you should do was to form a hard rock group and then release an album over there; it would definitely sell well... so the story went ..."

As the song reached the top of the German charts, the number one song which it displaced was "Relax" by Frankie Goes to Hollywood whose lead singer, Holly Johnson, had formerly been in the band Big in Japan – a remarkable coincidence, according to Gold. Gold later said that "we never got to speak with him but he must have wondered 'who is this German group with a song named after my band?'"

The video was directed by Yello's Dieter Meier.

Ironically, despite the name the song was never a hit in Japan.

Original 1984 release

Track listings
7" single
"Big in Japan" (7" Version) – 3:52
"Seeds" – 3:15

12" maxi
"Big in Japan" (7" Version) – 3:52
"Seeds" – 3:15

12" maxi Germany & France WEA 249417-0
"Big in Japan" (Extended Remix) – 7:25
"Big in Japan" (Extended Instrumental) – 6:10

12" maxi US WEA 0-86947
"Big in Japan" (Extended Vocal) – 7:25
"Big in Japan" (Instrumental Version) – 6:10
"Big in Japan" (7" Version) – 3:58

Charts and sales

Weekly charts

Year-end charts

Sales and certifications

1992 Re-release

Alphaville re-released the song, with new remixes, in 1992 to coincide with the release of their compilation album First Harvest 1984–92.

Track listings
EU CD single "Big in Japan 1992 A.D."
"Big in Japan 1992 A.D. Freedom Mix (Single Edit)" – 3:14
"Big in Japan The Mix (Single Edit)" – 4:14
"Big in Japan 1992 A.D. Freedom Mix (Extended Version)" – 4:51
"Big in Japan The Mix (Extended Version)" – 6:05

"The Mix (Extended Version)" is the same as the "Culture Mix" from First Harvest 1984–92.

EU CD single "Big in Japan Swemix Remix"
"Big in Japan (Swemix Remix 7")" – 3:57
"Big in Japan (Swemix Remix 12")" – 8:27
"Big in Japan (Swemix DUB)" – 6:44

EU 12" vinyl single "Big in Japan 1992 A.D."
"Big in Japan 1992 A.D. Freedom Mix (Extended Version)" – 4:51
"Big in Japan 1992 A.D. Freedom Dub" – 4:56
"Big in Japan The Mix (Extended Version)" – 6:05

The 12" single was printed on white vinyl and contains the unique "Dub" version of the Freedom remix

Charts
"Big in Japan 1992 AD" reached number two in Finland and number 15 in Sweden.

Guano Apes version

In 2000, Guano Apes released a cover version as their lead single for their second album Don't Give Me Names on 12 April 2000. The music video shows the band performing in an empty arena, followed by a fan trying to locate the band.

Track listing

CD single
Big in Japan – 2:49
Gogan – 2:47
I Want It – 3:17

7" single
Big in Japan – 2:48
I Want It – 3:15

Maxi single
Big in Japan – 2:49
Gogan – 2:47
I Want It – 3:17
La Noix – 2:19
Big in Japan (Space Jazz Dubmen Mix) – 4:32

Charts

See also
List of European number-one hits of 1984
List of number-one dance singles of 1984 (U.S.)
List of number-one hits of 1984 (Germany)
List of number-one singles and albums in Sweden
List of number-one singles of the 1980s (Switzerland)

References

External links
Lyrics of this song

Synth-pop songs
1984 debut singles
1984 songs
Alphaville (band) songs
European Hot 100 Singles number-one singles
Guano Apes songs
Number-one singles in Germany
Number-one singles in Sweden
Number-one singles in Switzerland
Songs about Japan
Songs written by Marian Gold
Songs written by Bernhard Lloyd
Songs written by Frank Mertens
Warner Music Group singles
Japan in non-Japanese culture
2000 singles